The 1936 Limerick Senior Hurling Championship was the 42nd staging of the Limerick Senior Hurling Championship since its establishment by the Limerick County Board.

Ahane were the defending champions.

Ahane won the championship after a 7-08 to 0-03 defeat of Croom in the final. It was their fifth championship title overall and their fourth title in succession.

Results

Final

References

Limerick Senior Hurling Championship
Limerick Senior Hurling Championship